Jeffrey Scott Reed (born November 12, 1962) is a former Major League Baseball catcher who played for the Minnesota Twins (1984–1986), Montreal Expos (1987–1988), Cincinnati Reds (1988–1992), San Francisco Giants (1993–1995), Colorado Rockies (1996–1998) and Chicago Cubs (1999–2000). He batted left-handed and threw right-handed.  He is currently a coach with the Elizabethton Twins and the Providence Knights.

Career
Reed was the Twins' first-round pick (and 12th overall) in the 1980 amateur draft.

Despite playing for 17 seasons in the majors, he was usually relegated to a backup role. Reed rarely appeared in more than 100 games per year. He was widely regarded as a solid defensive catcher.

On February 3, 1987, Reed was traded from the Twins along with Neal Heaton, Yorkis Perez and Al Cardwood to the Expos for Jeff Reardon and Tom Nieto.

On September 16, 1988, Reed, filling in for an injured Bo Díaz, caught Tom Browning's perfect game in the Cincinnati Reds' 1-0 victory over the Los Angeles Dodgers at Riverfront Stadium. In his autobiography, Browning credited Reed as an integral part of the performance: "He did a phenomenal job, especially considering what was at stake in the later innings."

During the late innings of Browning's perfect game, Reed had to continually slow down his pitcher. According to Browning's book, Reds manager Pete Rose was worried that his pitcher was working too quickly, which could lead to an errant pitch. At one point in the game, Reed stood up and raised his arms, palms facing out, to signal Browning to slow down.

References

 Tom Browning and Dann Stupp (2006). Tom Browning's Tales from the Reds Dugout. Sports Publishing LLC.

External links

Pura Pelota (Venezuelan Winter League)

1962 births
Living people
American expatriate baseball players in Canada
Baseball coaches from Illinois
Baseball players from Illinois
Chicago Cubs players
Cincinnati Reds players
Colorado Rockies players
Elizabethton Twins players
Indianapolis Indians players
Major League Baseball catchers
Minnesota Twins players
Minor league baseball coaches
Montreal Expos players
Nashville Sounds players
Orlando Twins players
San Francisco Giants players
San Jose Giants players
Scranton/Wilkes-Barre Red Barons players
Sportspeople from Joliet, Illinois
Tiburones de La Guaira players
American expatriate baseball players in Venezuela
Toledo Mud Hens players
Visalia Oaks players
Wisconsin Rapids Twins players